David Anthony Smith (born 1 September 1957 in Launceston, Tasmania) was an Australian cricket player, who played for the Tasmanian Tigers. He was a right-handed batting all-rounder, who bowled useful medium pace and represented Tasmania from 1977 until 1984.

See also
 List of Tasmanian representative cricketers

External links

1957 births
Living people
Australian cricketers
Tasmania cricketers
Cricketers from Launceston, Tasmania
Fellows of the American Physical Society